Pomacea prunella is a species of freshwater snail in the family Ampullariidae, native to Brazil. They have also been found in French Guiana. Unlike other New World Ampullariids, P. prunella has a calcified, rather than corneous, operculum.

References 

prunella
Freshwater snails
Molluscs of Brazil
Gastropods described in 1857
Fauna of French Guiana